This William F. Buckley Jr. bibliography contains a list of works by William F. Buckley Jr.

Articles
 "Replies from American Debaters," with Alfred MaKulec, Gordon Mack, Elizareth B. Flory, Roger Cozens, Howard E. Goldfarb, Charles E. Lilien, Harry B. Stults, Irwin Kuhr, Charles Radcliffe, Frederick M. Peyser Jr. & C. David Cornell. Quarterly Journal of Speech, vol. 36, no. 1 (1950), pp. 15-22. .
 "Harvard Hogs the Headlines." Human Events, vol. 8, no. 20 (1951), pp. 1–5. 
 "The Colossal Flunk." American Mercury (Mar. 1952), pp. 29–37.
 "What Price Uniformity?" Human Events, vol. 9, no. 24 (1952).
 "Father Fullman's Assault." Catholic World (Aug. 1952), pp. 328–333.
 "Freedom to Agree." American Mercury (Jun. 1953), pp. 101–107.
 "Does Just Any College Qualify?" The Freeman (Jun. 14, 1954), pp. 667–670.
 "The Liberal Mind." Facts Forum News (Jun. 1955), pp. 6, 52–57, 60.
 "On Experiencing Gore Vidal." Esquire (Aug. 1969), pp. 108–130.
 "Amnesty International." Newark Advocate (Apr. 13, 1970), p. 4. Archived from the original.
 "Human Rights and Foreign Policy: A Proposal." Foreign Affairs, vol. 58, no. 4 (Spring 1980), pp. 775–96. . .
 "The Poverty of Anti-Communism," with Robert Conquest, Nathan Glazer, and John Lukacs. The National Interest, no. 55 (Spring 1999), pp. 75–85. .

Non-fiction

Travel

Fiction

Blackford Oakes novels

References

External links
 Buckley Online an archive at Hillsdale College
  Featured Author: William F. Buckley Jr. The New York Times book reviews and articles
 "Where Does One Start?" National Review online symposium about his works

Books by William F. Buckley Jr.
Bibliographies by writer
Bibliographies of American writers